Khelvachauri is a village in the Autonomous Republic of Adjara in the southwest of Georgia,  southeast of the regional capital Batumi and situated on the right bank of the Chorokhi River. Between 1968 and 2011 it was a daba (urban-type settlement), but due to municipal border changes by far most of the town was absorbed into the city municipality of Batumi and Khelvachauri was downgraded to a village.

The territorial transfer also included the locations of the administrative centers of the Municipality of Khelvachauri. This means that Khelvachauri municipality is governed since 2011 from the territory of another municipality, Batumi. The remaining part of Khelvachauri that was left within the Khelvachauri Municipality falls administratively under the Sharabidze community (თემი, temi) of the municipality. Since then, roughly 1,100 people live in the village, which name is derived from the Khelvachadze family. The part annexed by Batumi has a center function for the surrounding villages with administrative, educational and health institutions, and businesses and remains the governing center for Khelvachauri Municipality.

During the Russo-Georgian War in 2008, several targets near Khelvachauri were bombed by the Russian air force, including a military base that had been handed over by the Russian army a year earlier as part of the agreed departure from Georgia. Until the end of 2007, the Russian 12th Military Base was located in Batumi and Khelvachauri.

Population  
The 2014 census counted 1,085 residents in the remainder of Khelvachauri. Due to the demotion of the town, it is no longer included in the annually published population statistics of the National Statistical Bureau, Geostat. The population consists almost entirely of Georgians.

See also

 Adjara
 Batumi

References 

Populated places in Adjara